United States v. Richardson, 418 U.S. 166 (1974), was a United States Supreme Court case concerning standing in which the Court held  a taxpayer's interest in government spending was generalized, and too "undifferentiated" to confer Article III standing to challenge a law which exempted Central Intelligence Agency funding from Article I, Section 9 requirements that such expenditures be audited and reported to the public.

Background 
In 1949, Congress passed the Central Intelligence Agency Act, which exempted funding for the CIA from financial disclosure.

William B. Richardson, an insurance claims adjuster, first attempted to challenge the CIA Act in 1968, in Richardson v. Sekel, 408 F.2d 844 (3rd Cir. 1969), but the case was unsuccessful at District court and the United States Court of Appeals for the Third Circuit denied certiorari.  In 1972, he tried again, filing suit in the United States District Court for the Western District of Pennsylvania.  Richardson argued that the Act was in violation of the penultimate clause of  Article I, Section 9 of the United States Constitution, which states "No Money shall be drawn from the Treasury, but in Consequence of Appropriations made by Law; and a regular Statement and Account of Receipts and Expenditures of all public Money shall be published from time to time." The District Court dismissed the case for standing; the Third Circuit, hearing the case en banc, reversed;  in 1973, the Supreme Court granted certiorari.

Representatives

 Robert H. Bork for the United States et al.
 Osmond K. Fraenkel for the respondent

Opinion of the Court 

Chief Justice Warren Burger delivered the opinion of the Court, which found that Richardson lacked standing to challenge the Act. noting that any "impact on him  is plainly undifferentiated and "common to all members of the public."  This failed to meet the standard enunciated in Flast v. Cohen and its predecessor, Frothingham v. Mellon. Burger concluded:

References

External links
 

1974 in United States case law
United States Supreme Court cases
United States Supreme Court cases of the Burger Court